The Iglesia del Carmen de Burgos is a Catholic parish church built in Burgos, Castile and León, Spain. It is a modern building, built in 1966–1968, replacing a demolished baroque building. It is located at the intersection of Paseo del Empecinado with Calle del Carmen, between the Arlanzón River and the old railway. The church was inaugurated on 7 July 1968.

References

Roman Catholic churches in Burgos
Roman Catholic churches completed in 1968
20th-century Roman Catholic church buildings in Spain